"Dégaine" is a song by French-Malian singer Aya Nakamura featuring Belgian rapper Damso. It was released on 9 March 2022. It debuted atop  the French charts.

Compositions
"Dégaine" is a song with kizomba and kompa influences. It was written by Aya Nakamura and Damso and produced by Bleu Nuit.

Charts

Weekly charts

Year-end charts

Certifications

References

2022 singles
2022 songs
Aya Nakamura songs
SNEP Top Singles number-one singles
Songs written by Aya Nakamura
Zouk songs